Bankim Nagar railway station is a halt railway station of the Kolkata Suburban Railway system and operated by Eastern Railway. It is located on the Ranaghat–Gede line in Nadia in the Indian state of West Bengal.

References

External links

Sealdah railway division
Kolkata Suburban Railway stations
Railway stations in Nadia district